Lorna E. Thorpe is an American epidemiologist who is a professor and Director of the Division of Epidemiology at NYU Langone Health. She serves as Vice Chair of Strategy and Planning in the Department of Population Health and on the Board of the American College of Epidemiology.

Early life and education 
Thorpe was an undergraduate student at the Johns Hopkins University. Thorpe earned a masters of public health at the University of Michigan. After graduating, she moved to China, where she worked on family planning and the HIV/AIDS program. Thorpe moved to the University of Illinois Chicago for her doctoral research, where she studied the impact of drug use on blood borne pathogens. She was a medical fellow in epidemiology at the Centers for Disease Control and Prevention where she focused on epidemic intelligence, working in the international tuberculosis control.

Research and career 
Thorpe started her academic career at New York City Department of Health and Mental Hygiene, where she served as Deputy Commissioner on Epidemiology. In this capacity she oversaw the growth of the epidemiology division, and invested in initiatives to better understand the needs of New York City residents. After nine years at the health department she moved to the CUNY Graduate School of Public Health & Health Policy where she was made Chair of the Department of Epidemiology, and co-Director of the NYU–CUNY Prevention Research Center, where she worked with the Centers for Disease Control and Prevention on reducing disparities in cardiovascular disease.

Thorpe joined NYU Langone Health in 2016. She specializes in population health surveillance and the relationship between epidemiology and public policy. Her research has considered hypertension, environmental exposure and the impact of the September 11 attacks on public health. Her research showed that neighborhoods in the United States with easily accessible fast food outlets were linked to higher rates of Type 2 diabetes.

Selected publications

References 

American epidemiologists
Year of birth missing (living people)
Living people